Dânan is a town in the Ali Sabieh Region of Djibouti. It is located around 43 kilometers south of the capital, Djibouti City.

Overview
Nearby towns and villages include Holhol (12 km) and Ali Adde (22 km).

Demographics
The population of Dânan has been estimated to be 463. The town inhabitants belong to various mainly Afro-Asiatic-speaking ethnic groups, with the Issa Somali predominant.

Populated places in Djibouti